Khulani Commercial High School is a secondary school that used to specialise in Commercial education. Since the introduction of National Curriculum Statement by the public department of basic education, the school was reintroduced as a general public secondary school without any specialisation. The school is based in Mdantsane (Buffalo City Metropolitan Municipality), Eastern Cape, South Africa.

References

High schools in South Africa
Schools in the Eastern Cape
Buffalo City Metropolitan Municipality